Morten Eriksen (born 26 April 1983) is a Norwegian football striker who currently plays for Sola.

Career
Eriksen retired after the 2011 season, but made a comeback a few months later in 2012.

Career statistics

References

1983 births
Living people
Sportspeople from Kristiansand
Norwegian footballers
Sandnes Ulf players
Sola FK players
Eliteserien players
Norwegian First Division players
Norwegian Second Division players
Norwegian Third Division players
Norwegian Fourth Division players
Association football forwards